
Year 275 (CCLXXV) was a common year starting on Friday (link will display the full calendar) of the Julian calendar. At the time, it was known as the Year of the Consulship of Aurelianus and Marcellinus (or, less frequently, year 1028 Ab urbe condita). The denomination 275 for this year has been used since the early medieval period, when the Anno Domini calendar era became the prevalent method in Europe for naming years.

Events

By place

Roman Empire 
 Emperor Aurelian puts down unrest in Gaul, and defeats Germanic incursions into Gaul and Raetia (these problems had been caused by Aurelian's defeat and overthrow of the Gallic Empire).
 The Goths begin to raid Thrace and Asia Minor. Aurelian begins a campaign against the Goths in Thrace, but he is then assassinated near Byzantium (Turkey) by some of his officers. Aurelian had developed a reputation for punishing corruption with severity, and his secretary Eros was under suspicion. As a result, Eros, fearing for his life, had forged a list of high-ranking officers marked for execution. In this way, the secretary tricked the officers into assassinating Aurelian, and they then fled into Asia Minor to avoid the wrath of the soldiers. Unusual for the period, the imperial field army defers to the Senate to choose a successor.
 September 25 – Marcus Claudius Tacitus is proclaimed Emperor by the Senate; his half brother Marcus Annius Florianus becomes praetorian prefect.
 Tacitus marches into Asia Minor to fight the Goths and track down the faction responsible for assassinating Aurelian.

Asia 
 The Pallava Dynasty begins in Southern India.

By topic

Religion 
 January 4 – Eutychian  succeeds Felix I as the 27th pope of Rome.

Births 
 Saint George, Roman soldier and Christian martyr (approximate date)

Deaths 
 Aurelian, Roman emperor (b. 214 or 215)
 Peroz I Kushanshah, ruler of the Sasanian Kingdom
 Zenobia, queen of the Palmyrene Empire (b. 240)

References